Endothenia polymetalla is a species of moth of the family Tortricidae. It is found in Australia, where it has been recorded from Queensland.

The wingspan is about 8 mm. The forewings are whitish, mixed with brown and fuscous. There are four transverse leaden-metallic lines and a brown-and-fuscous median transverse fascia. The hindwings are grey.

References

Moths described in 1911
Endotheniini